Banda Osiris are an Italian ensemble of musicians, actors and composers.

Career 
The group formed in 1980, in Vercelli. Their name is a pun/tribute to Italian revue soubrette, actress and singer Wanda Osiris. They initially  started their career with street performances, mixing music, acting and comedy. With "Banda Osiris di Giorno" they debuted on stage, and through the theatrical dimension they had a growing success, especially with the shows "Storia della musica voll. 1 e 2", under the direction of Gabriele Salvatores, and "Sinfonia Fantastica" directed by Maurizio Nichetti.

The group composed and performed several musical film scores, winning the Silver Berlin Bear for Best Film Music as well as the David di Donatello  for Best Score and the Nastro d'Argento in the same category for the Matteo Garrone's 2004 drama film First Love.

Personnel 

 Gianluigi Carlone: voice, flute, soprano sax 
     Roberto Carlone: bass, keyboard, trombone 
     Giancarlo Macrì: percussion, tuba 
     Sandro Berti: guitar, mandolin, trombone

Discography 
Albums  
     1987 – Volume 1.2.3.4.5.6.7.8.9.10.11.12  
     2000 – Colonne sonore  
     2002 – Amore con la S maiuscola  
     2002 – L'imbalsamatore  
     2004 – Primo amore  
     2005 – Tartarughe sul dorso  
     2005 – Il cinema di Matteo Garrone  
     2006 – Anche libero va bene  
     2006 – Banda.25  
 
 DVD  
 
     2007 – Banda 25 – Lo spettacolo  
     2007 – Guarda che luna!

References

External links
  

 

Musical groups established in 1980
1980 establishments in Italy
Italian film score composers
David di Donatello winners
Nastro d'Argento winners
Italian musical groups